Thomas Morris McHugh (November 22, 1822 – March 19, 1856) was an Irish American immigrant and lawyer who served as the first Secretary of State of Wisconsin.  He had previously served as Secretary of the Territorial Council and the second Wisconsin Constitutional Convention.

Biography
Thomas McHugh was born in County Leitrim, Ireland, to Elizabeth Norris and the Reverend Stephen McHugh. His father was an Episcopal minister.  He studied law at Utica, New York, and moved with his parents to Delavan, in the Wisconsin Territory, in 1844, where his father established an Episcopal parish.

In 1847, McHugh was chosen as Secretary to the Wisconsin Territorial Council, and, in 1848, was Secretary for the second Wisconsin Constitutional Convention.  In May 1848, he was elected the first Secretary of State of Wisconsin.  He was admitted to the State Bar of Wisconsin in 1849.  He later served as Chief Clerk to the Wisconsin State Assembly in the 1853 and 1854 sessions.

He died, unmarried, in Palatka, Florida, March 19, 1856.

References

Further reading 

Secretaries of State of Wisconsin
Wisconsin Democrats
People from Delavan, Wisconsin
1822 births
1856 deaths